
Gmina Dziemiany is a rural gmina (administrative district) in Kościerzyna County, Pomeranian Voivodeship, in northern Poland.

The gmina contains part of the protected area called Wdydze Landscape Park.

Villages
Gmina Dziemiany contains the villages and settlements of Belfort, Białe Błoto, Borsztal, Czarne, Dąbrówka, Dębina, Dunajki, Dywan, Dziemiany, Głuchy Bór, Jastrzębie Dziemiańskie, Kalisz, Kalwaria, Kloc, Lampkowo, Leżuchowo, Milkowo, Mutkowo, Nowe Słone, Pełki, Piechowice, Płęsy, Przerębska Huta, Raduń, Rów, Rozwalewo, Schodno, Słupinko, Stare Słone, Szablewo, Tklania, Tomaszewo, Trzebuń, Turzonka, Wilczewo, Żabowo, Zajączkowo, Zarośle, Zatrzebionka and Zimny Dwór.

Neighbouring gminas
Gmina Dziemiany is bordered by the gminas of Brusy, Karsin, Kościerzyna, Lipusz and Studzienice.

References
Polish official population figures 2006

Dziemiany
Kościerzyna County